1911 was the 22nd season of County Championship cricket in England. Warwickshire were champions for the first time.

Honours
County Championship – Warwickshire
Minor Counties Championship – Staffordshire
Wisden (Five Members of the MCC's Team in Australia) – Frank Foster, J W Hearne, Sep Kinneir, Phil Mead, Herbert Strudwick

County Championship

Leading batsmen
C B Fry topped the averages with 1728 runs at 72.00

Leading bowlers
George Thompson topped the averages with 113 wickets at 16.71

References

Annual reviews
 Wisden Cricketers' Almanack 1912

External links
 CricketArchive – season summaries

1911 in English cricket
English cricket seasons in the 20th century